The Beal is a small river in Greater Manchester, England, and is a tributary of the River Roch. It rises in the Beal Valley in green space between Sholver and Royton, before continuing northwards through Shaw and Crompton, Newhey, Milnrow and Belfield.

Course
From its source at Beal Valley, it flows north through Shaw and Crompton in the Metropolitan Borough of Oldham, where Old Brook and Pencil Brook are tributaries.  It continues north through Newhey and Milnrow in the Metropolitan Borough of Rochdale, before joining the River Roch at Belfield.

In part, the river forms a boundary between Oldham on one side and Royton and Shaw and Crompton on the other.

A small part of the course runs perpendicular to the Metrolink line, between Shaw and Crompton and Derker.

History
1212: The Beal valley was recorded as part of the thegnage estate of Kaskenmoor, held on behalf of King John by Roger de Montbegon and William de Nevill.

1892: Ellenroad Cotton Mill was built on the bank of the Beal, and made fine cotton yarn by mule spinning.

During operation of a bleaching and dying works, discharge to the river of used dyes and waste would cause it to change colour from one day to another.

 1997: Littlewoods PLC changed the course of the river slightly to allow development of their Shaw National Distribution Warehouse Centre.

2005: Raw sewage was discharged to the river, killing thousands of fish and raising health fears among local residents.

Tributaries

Butterworth Hall Brook
Piethorne Brook
Jubilee Brook
Old Brook
Leornardin Brook
Pencil Brook
Besom Hill Brook
Fullwood Brook
Hodge Brook

Gallery

References

Rivers of Greater Manchester
Rivers of the Metropolitan Borough of Oldham
Rivers of the Metropolitan Borough of Rochdale
Rivers of Milnrow and Newhey
1Beal